Quantitative behavioral finance is a new discipline that uses mathematical and statistical methodology to understand behavioral biases in conjunction with valuation. 

The research can be grouped into the following areas:
 Empirical studies that demonstrate significant deviations from classical theories.
 Modeling using the concepts of behavioral effects together with the non-classical assumption of the finiteness of assets.
 Forecasting based on these methods.
 Studies of experimental asset markets and use of models to forecast experiments.

History
The prevalent theory of financial markets during the second half of the 20th century has been the efficient market hypothesis (EMH) which states that all public information is incorporated into asset prices. Any deviation from this true price is quickly exploited by informed traders who attempt to optimize their returns and it restores the true equilibrium price. For all practical purposes, then, market prices behave as though all traders were pursuing their self-interest with complete information and rationality.

Toward the end of the 20th century, this theory was challenged in several ways. First, there were a number of large market events that cast doubt on the basic assumptions. On October 19, 1987 the Dow Jones average plunged over 20% in a single day, as many smaller stocks suffered deeper losses. The large oscillations on the ensuing days provided a graph that resembled the famous crash of 1929. The crash of 1987 provided a puzzle and challenge to most economists who had believed that such volatility should not exist in an age when information and capital flows are much more efficient than they were in the 1920s.

As the decade continued, the Japanese market soared to heights that were far from any realistic assessment of the valuations. Price-earnings ratios soared to triple digits, as Nippon Telephone and Telegraph achieved a market valuation (stock market price times the number of shares) that exceeded the entire market capitalization of West Germany.  In early 1990 the Nikkei index stood at 40,000, having nearly doubled in two years.  In less than a year the Nikkei dropped to nearly half its peak.

Meanwhile, in the US the growth of new technology, particularly the internet, spawned a new generation of high tech companies, some of which became publicly traded long before any profits. As in the Japanese stock market bubble a decade earlier these stocks soared to market valuations of billions of dollars sometimes before they even had revenue. The bubble continued into 2000 and the consequent bust reduced many of these stocks to a few percent of their prior market value. Even some large and profitable tech companies lost 80% of their value during the period 2000-2003.

These large bubbles and crashes in the absence of significant changes in valuation cast doubt on the assumption of efficient markets that incorporate all public information accurately. In his book, “Irrational Exuberance”, Robert Shiller discusses the excesses that have plagued markets, and concludes that stock prices move in excess of changes in valuation. This line of reasoning has also been confirmed in several studies (e.g., Jeffrey Pontiff ), of closed-end funds which trade like stocks, but have a precise valuation that is reported frequently. (See Seth Anderson and Jeffrey Born “Closed-end Fund Pricing”   for review of papers relating to these
issues.)

In addition to these world developments, other challenges to classical economics and EMH came from the new field of experimental economics pioneered by Vernon L. Smith who won the 2002 Nobel Prize in Economics. These experiments (in collaboration with Gerry Suchanek, Arlington Williams and David Porter and others) featuring participants trading an asset defined by the experimenters on a network of computers. A series of experiments involved a single asset which pays a fixed dividend during each of 15 periods and then becomes worthless. Contrary to the expectations of classical economics, trading prices often soar to levels much higher than the expected payout. Similarly, other experiments showed that many of the expected results of classical economics and game theory are not borne out in experiments. A key part of these experiments is that participants earn real money as a consequence of their trading decisions, so that the experiment is an actual market rather than a survey of opinion.

Behavioral finance (BF) is a field that has grown during the past two decades in part as a reaction to the phenomena described above. Using a variety of methods researchers have documented systematic biases (e.g., underreaction, overreaction, etc.) that occur among professional investors as well as novices. Behavioral finance researchers generally do not subscribe to EMH as a consequence of these biases. However, EMH theorists counter that while EMH makes a precise prediction about a market based upon the data, BF usually does not go beyond saying that EMH is wrong.

Research in Quantitative Behavioral Finance
The attempt to quantify basic biases and to use them in mathematical models is the subject of Quantitative Behavioral Finance. Caginalp and collaborators have used both statistical and mathematical methods on both the world market data and experimental economics data in order to make quantitative predictions. In a series of papers dating back to 1989, Caginalp and collaborators have studied asset market dynamics using differential equations that incorporate strategies and biases of investors such as the price trend and valuation within a system that has finite cash and asset. This feature is distinct from classical finance in which there is the assumption of infinite arbitrage.

One of the predictions of this theory by Caginalp and Balenovich (1999)  was that a larger supply of cash per share would result in a larger bubble. Experiments by Caginalp, Porter and Smith (1998)  confirmed that doubling the level of cash, for example, while maintaining constant number of shares essentially doubles the magnitude of the bubble.

Using the differential equations to predict experimental markets as they evolved also proved successful, as the equations were approximately as accurate as human forecasters who had been selected as the best traders of previous experiments (Caginalp, Porter and Smith).

The challenge of using these ideas to forecast price dynamics in financial markets has been the focus of some of the recent work that has merged two different mathematical methods. The differential equations can be used in conjunction with statistical methods to provide short term forecasts.

One of the difficulties in understanding the dynamics of financial markets has been the presence of “noise” (Fischer Black). Random world events are always making changes in valuations that are difficult to extract from any deterministic forces that may be present. Consequently, many statistical studies have only shown a negligible non-random component. For example, Poterba and Summers demonstrate a tiny trend effect in stock prices. White showed that using neural networks with 500 days of IBM stock was unsuccessful in terms of short term forecasts.

In both of these examples, the level of “noise” or changes in valuation apparently exceeds any possible behavioral effects. A methodology that avoids this pitfall has been developed during the past decade. If one can subtract out the valuation as it varies in time, one can study the remaining behavioral effects, if any. An early study along these lines (Caginalp and Greg Consantine) studied the ratio of two clone closed-end funds. Since these funds had the same portfolio but traded independently, the ratio is independent of valuation. A statistical time series study showed that this ratio was highly non-random, and that the best predictor of tomorrow’s price is not today’s price (as suggested by EMH) but halfway between the price and the price trend.

The subject of overreactions has also been important in behavioral finance. In his 2006 PhD thesis, Duran examined 130,000 data points of daily prices for closed-end funds in terms of their deviation from the net asset value (NAV). Funds exhibiting a large deviation from NAV were likely to behave in the opposite direction of the subsequent day. Even more interesting was the statistical observation that a large deviation in the opposite direction preceded such large deviations. These precursors may suggest that an underlying cause of these large moves—in the absence of significant change in valuation—may be due to the positioning of traders in advance of anticipated news. For example, suppose many traders are anticipating positive news and buy the stock. If the positive news does not materialize they are inclined to sell in large numbers, thereby suppressing the price significantly below the previous levels. This interpretation is inconsistent with EMH but is consistent with asset flow differential equations (AFDE) that incorporate behavioral concepts with the finiteness of assets. Research continues on efforts to optimize the parameters of the asset flow equations in order to forecast near term prices (see Duran and Caginalp ).

It is important to classify the behavior of solutions for the dynamical system of nonlinear differential equations. Duran  studied the stability analysis of the solutions for the dynamical system of nonlinear AFDEs in R^4, in three versions, analytically and numerically. He found the existence of the infinitely many fixed points (equilibrium points) for the first two versions. He concluded that these versions of AFDEs are structurally unstable systems mathematically by using an extension of the Peixoto Theorem for two-dimensional manifolds to a four-dimensional manifold. Moreover, he obtained that there is no critical point (equilibrium point) if the chronic discount over the past finite time interval is nonzero for the third version of AFDEs.

References

Research in the news 
 NY Times Article
 Pittsburgh Tribune-Review Article

External links
 Caginalp's Papers via SSRN
 Duran's Papers via SSRN
 Madura's Papers via SSRN
 Smith's Papers via SSRN

Behavioral finance
Financial economics
Mathematical finance
Market trends
History of economic thought